Her Name Was Tragedy is the first EP by the band Dead and Divine, and was released in 2004.

Track listing
"Painting With Knives & Gunshots" - 5:05
"The Bloodiest Of Valentines Days" - 3:53
"So Deadly, Yet Beautiful" - 4:52
"Wrapped In Red" - 4:56

2004 EPs
Dead and Divine albums